The SWK MOBIL GmbH is a public transport operator in the city of Krefeld, and part of the Viersen district in Western Germany. The company is a fully owned subsidiary of Stadtwerke Krefeld (SWK), offering tramway and bus services. It is a member of both the Verkehrsverbund Rhein-Ruhr (VRR) and the Verkehrsgemeinschaft Niederrhein (VGN) transport associations.

Krefeld
Public transport operators of Germany